Serero is the surname of the following people:
David Serero (architect) (born 1974), French architect
David Serero (opera singer) (born 1981), French opera singer, actor, producer and philanthropist
Pepetua Serero (died 1989), Bougainvillean activist in Papua New Guinea
Thulani Serero (born 1990), South African football midfielder